Rocky Mountain Animal Defense (RMAD) was a U.S.-based non-profit 501(c)(3) organization that helped eliminate the human-imposed suffering of animals in the Rocky Mountain region. The group was formed in 1994. RMAD furthered its mission through public education, community outreach, litigation, legislation and hands-on work. As of May, 2010, the group was renamed Rocky Mountain Justice for Animals under the leadership of Executive Director Karen Breslin.

History
In 1993, an undercover exposé of conditions (Part 1, Part 2) was filmed at an intensive egg farm operation in Boulder, Colorado. Leveraging the publicity generated by the video, a small but dedicated group of volunteers banded together to form RMAD. Historically, volunteer effort has fueled the work of RMAD. Over the years, paid staff has been phased in to support these volunteers, conduct program work, and administer the organization.

Funding
Approximately 75 percent of RMAD's funding came from individual contributions and membership dues. Approximately 20 percent came from foundations. The remaining 5 percent came from businesses and corporations. The organization devoted approximately 80 percent of its budget toward programs that directly supported education and advocacy efforts on behalf of animals. It used about 20 percent of its budget for administration and organizational development.

See also
 List of animal rights groups

External links 
Denver Post, LA Times, Environmental Magazine
"Raw Footage, Raw Pain" documentary (Part 1, Part 2)

Animal welfare organizations based in the United States
Non-profit organizations based in Colorado
Organizations based in Denver
Organizations established in 1994